Dicrocheles phalaenodectes is a parasitic mite which infests the ear of certain species of noctuid moths. They are notable in that only one ear is ever colonised, leaving one intact so that the host is still able to detect the sound from hunting bats. 
This is taken to be an adaptation reducing the 'virulence' of the parasite to prevent its host's destruction, and therefore its own. The mechanism in which this is accomplished is with a pheromone trail around the uncolonized ear, which leads to the colonized ear. Once an ear is colonized, scouts are sent to the other ear periodically to see if there are any mites and lead any they find to the correct ear. This further refreshes the pheromone trail.

A population of moths was found in New Zealand in which both ears were parasitised, the local bat population being extinct.

References

Further reading
 Hoyt,Eric & Shultz,Ted (1999). Insect lives: stories of mystery and romance from a hidden world. 
https://web.archive.org/web/20131209073102/http://benthebutterflyguy.blogspot.co.uk/2009/10/trombidiums-dicrocheles-mites-and-their.html

Laelapidae
Parasites of insects